Laurier is both a surname and a given name. Notable people with the name include:

Surname:
 Alain Laurier, French footballer
 Jan Laurier, Dutch senator
 Lucie Laurier, actress
 Robert Laurier, Canadian lawyer and politician
 Romuald-Charlemagne Laurier, politician and half-brother of Sir Wilfrid Laurier
 Ruben Charles Laurier, Canadian physician and politician
 Wilfrid Laurier (1841–1919), Prime Minister of Canada
 Zoé Laurier, wife of Sir Wilfrid

Given name:
 Laurier J. Boisvert, president of the Canadian Space Agency
 Laurier LaPierre, Canadian senator
 Laurier Lévesque, Canadian politician
 Laurier Régnier, Canadian member of parliament
 Wilfrid Laurier McDougald, Canadian senator